Halulu Lake is a lake in the south central region of the island of Niʻihau (the smallest inhabited island in the chain). It is the largest (non-intermittent) natural lake in the Hawaiian Islands and ranks third in size after Hālaliʻi Lake (also on Niʻihau) and Keālia Pond (on Maui) which are intermittent bodies of water.

The lake measures around  during the rainy seasons. During dry periods on the arid island, the shallow lake shrinks due to effect of evaporation.

According to Hawaiian linguists Mary Kawena Pukui, Samuel H. Elbert, and Esther T. Mookini, the lake shares its name with the land division of Halulu on the island and probably originated from the man-eating halulu bird of Hawaiian mythology. Hālaliʻi and Halulu were also the names of important Hawaiian high chiefs (aliʻi) of the island of Niʻihau.

Prior to the attack on Pearl Harbor during World War II, Niʻihau owner and rancher Aylmer Francis Robinson plowed trenches using mules and tractors into the lakes and surrounding lands on Niʻihau to prevent Japanese planes from landing and using the island as a military airfield. These efforts led to the crash landing of Imperial Japanese Navy Air Service pilot Shigenori Nishikaichi during the Niihau incident. Many of the furrows are still visible today on the island.

The lake provides natural wetland habitats for Hawaiian bird species including the ʻalae keʻokeʻo (Hawaiian coot), aeʻo (Hawaiian stilt) and koloa maoli (Hawaiian duck).
The lake is also home to mullets which naturally enter the lake from the sea through lava tubes when they are young. In ancient Hawaii, a kapu forbade Hawaiians from catching the fish in the lake except during harvest time. Modern day Niihauans use the lakes and ponds on the island for mullet farming, bringing the baby pua mullets from the sea in barrels. The grown fish are later sold at market on Kauaʻi and Oʻahu.

See also 
 List of lakes in Hawaii

References

Bibliography 

Bodies of water of Niihau
Lakes of Hawaii